Atoy Wilson (born around 1951 or 1952) is a retired American figure skater. Coached by Mabel Fairbanks and then Peter Betts, he represented the Los Angeles Skating Club. In 1965, he was the first African-American skater to compete at the U.S. Figure Skating Championships, placing second in the novice division. At the 1966 championships, he won the novice title, becoming the first black to win a national title in figure skating. He left amateur competition in 1971 and toured professionally with Ice Follies and Holiday on Ice until 1988.

Following his retirement as a performer, Wilson was a coach and assistant director of ice skating schools for Hyatt Regency hotels in Dubai. A stint on the business side of Warner Brothers followed, and he is currently involved in production accounting for the television industry.

Results

References

1950s births
American male single skaters
African-American sportsmen
Living people
Year of birth missing (living people)
21st-century African-American people
20th-century African-American sportspeople